Xinyi Middle School is located in the south of Xinyi District of Maoming City in Guangdong Province, China. As the first county school in Xinyi District which was set up in 1916, Xinyi Middle School is also the first class school of Guangdong Province as well as Guangdong Province Civilization Unit. In 2007, passing the high school teaching evaluation, Xinyi Middle school became a national-level model high school in Guangdong Province.

History 
The school was established in Zhenlong in 1916, and was originally called Zhongyi School. In 1941 it expanded, adding a high school section, and relocated from Zhenlong to Xinyi in 1955. Teaching activities were suspended in 1966 at the start of the Cultural Revolution, resuming again in 1978 after the end of the Cultural Revolution. In 2001 the school moved again, to its current location in Xinyi Education Town

Infrastructure 
The teaching building has five storeys, containing 100 classrooms and 10 lecture theaters. All classrooms are equipped with multimedia and high-speed internet infrastructure.

References 

Schools in Guangdong
Maoming